Zoogloea oryzae is a nitrogen-fixing, catalase and oxidase-positiv, motile bacterium with a polar flagellum from the genus of Zoogloea which was isolated from the soil from a rice paddy field.

References

External links
Type strain of Zoogloea oryzae at BacDive -  the Bacterial Diversity Metadatabase

Rhodocyclaceae
Bacteria described in 2006